Todhills Rest Area is a rest area in between Junctions 44 and 45 of the M6 motorway in England. It is the last Services northbound on the M6 and the first southbound. It was first opened in the 1980s on the A74. When the M6 was extended in 2008, it was initially believed that Todhills would need to close so the road could be widened, but this did not prove to be the case, and the widening scheme was completed without having to close the rest area.

References

M6 motorway service stations
Moto motorway service stations
Transport in Cumbria
Buildings and structures in Cumbria
Rockcliffe, Cumbria